Pedro Flores (born 14 January 1951) is a Mexican former professional boxer who competed from 1973 to 1982, holding the WBA light flyweight title in 1981.

Professional career
In November 1973, in Pedro's pro debut he upset the undefeated Ramon Novelo by T.K.O. in the seventh round.

WBA Light Flyweight Championship
On September 26, 1981, Flores won the WBA Light Flyweight title by upsetting an undefeated Yoko Gushiken with a twelfth round T.K.O. in Gushikawa, Okinawa, Japan. This bout was a rematch, as Gushiken had outpointed Flores in a prior world title bout.

Professional boxing record

See also
List of Mexican boxing world champions
List of WBA world champions
List of light flyweight boxing champions

References

External links

Boxers from Jalisco
Sportspeople from Guadalajara, Jalisco
World boxing champions
World Boxing Association champions
World light-flyweight boxing champions
Light-flyweight boxers
1951 births
Living people
Mexican male boxers
Boxers at the 1971 Pan American Games
Pan American Games medalists in boxing
Pan American Games gold medalists for Mexico
Medalists at the 1971 Pan American Games
20th-century Mexican people
21st-century Mexican people